The 1938 Idaho Vandals football team represented the University of Idaho in the 1938 college football season. The Vandals were led by fourth-year head coach Ted Bank and were members of the Pacific Coast Conference. Home games were played on campus in Moscow at Neale Stadium, in its second season.

Season
Led on the field by passing halfback Hal Roise, Idaho compiled a 6–3–1 overall record and were 2–3–1 in the PCC.

After an opening win at Oregon State, the Vandals went to Husky Stadium in Seattle and tied Washington, breaking a 13-game losing streak to the Huskies. The teams previously tied in 1907 and Idaho's only wins came in 1900 and 1905; the Huskies have won all 19 games in this series since, all in Seattle, last meeting in 2016.

Late October marked the 25th game with Montana and the first for the Little Brown Stein trophy. With the 19–6 win in Missoula on homecoming, Idaho extended its series advantage over the Grizzlies to 19–5–1.

In the Battle of the Palouse with neighbor Washington State, the Vandals suffered an eleventh straight loss, falling 12–0 in the snow at homecoming on November 12. It was the Cougars' first visit to and Idaho's first loss in Neale Stadium, which opened the previous year; the Vandals had won the first five games played there. The next win over Washington State came in 1954.

Idaho finished the season with a two-game road trip to the state of Utah. Using their second string, the Vandals won 14–0 over Utah State of Logan in Ogden; five days later they won  over undefeated Mountain States conference champion Utah in Salt Lake City on Thanksgiving.

The six wins were the most for the UI program and was not improved upon for 33 more years, until the 8–3 season in 1971 under Don Robbins. It was also the only winning season for a quarter century, until Dee Andros' 1963 team posted a 5–4 mark. In between, three teams had even .500 records: 1947, 1952, and 1957. This was the last season in which the Vandals recorded two PCC wins; the conference disbanded in the spring of 1959. They did not have consecutive winning seasons again until 1983, the second of fifteen straight.
 
Future coaches (and administrators) that played on this team included seniors Steve Belko, Tony Knap, and Lyle Smith.

Schedule

All-conference
No Vandals were named to the All-Coast team; end Tony Knap was a second team selection.

NFL Draft
Two Vandal seniors were selected in the 1939 NFL Draft, which lasted 22 rounds (200 selections).

List of Idaho Vandals in the NFL Draft

References

External links
Gem of the Mountains: 1939 University of Idaho yearbook – 1938 football season
Go Mighty Vandals – 1938 football season
WSU Libraries: Game video – Washington State at Idaho – November 12, 1938
Idaho Argonaut – student newspaper – 1938 editions

Idaho
Idaho Vandals football seasons
Idaho Vandals football